Manuchar "Manu" Markoishvili (born 17 November 1986) is a former Georgian professional basketball player.

Early career
Markoishvili as a young basketball player was very talented, and he turned into a professional basketball player in Georgia before he graduated from high school. He played for Basco Batumi in the 2001–02 season. In Basco, he distinguished himself, even though he was the youngest player of the team.

Professional career
Markoishvili was scouted and recruited by the Italian League club Benetton Treviso in 2002. He would even play in the EuroLeague at the young age of 15 years old, being the youngest player to participate in the event at the time. In 2004, he was loaned to Mitteldeutscher of the German League for the season, and with them he won the FIBA Europe Cup. 

In 2004, he moved to the Slovenian club Olimpija Ljubljana. He entered the 2007 NBA draft, but he went undrafted. In 2007, he was transferred to the Ukrainian League club BC Kyiv. From 2009 to 2013, he played with Pallacanestro Cantù of the Italian League. 

On 29 January 2013 Markoishvili signed with the Turkish team Galatasaray, for the rest of the 2013–14 season. 

On 11 July 2014 Markoishvili signed a two-year contract with the Russian team CSKA Moscow. In his first season with the team, CSKA Moscow won the 2014–15 VTB United League season, after eliminating Khimki, with a 3–0 series sweep in the league's playoff finals. On 24 July 2015 he parted ways with CSKA.

On 20 August 2015 he signed with the Turkish club Darüşşafaka, of the BSL.

On 26 August 2017 he signed with the Italian club Pallacanestro Reggiana, of the LBA.

On 17 September 2019 he announced his retirement at the age of 32.

Georgian national team
Markoishvili was a member of the senior men's Georgian national basketball team. With Georgia's senior national team, he played at EuroBasket 2011, EuroBasket 2013, and at Eurobasket 2017.
Soon after his retirement, he was appointed to the assistant coaches job with the Georgian national basketball team.

Personal life
His father, Nugzar Markoishvili, is a retired professional basketball player, who is currently a basketball coach at Tbilisi State University. Markoishvili's brother, Giorgi, is also a professional basketball player in Georgia.

See also
List of youngest EuroLeague players

References

External links

Manuchar Markoishvili at draftexpress.com
Manuchar Markoishvili at eurobasket.com
Manuchar Markoishvili at euroleague.net
Manuchar Markoishvili at fiba.com (archive)
Manuchar Markoishvili at fibaeurope.com
Manuchar Markoishvili at legabasket.it 

1986 births
Living people
BC Kyiv players
Darüşşafaka Basketbol players
Galatasaray S.K. (men's basketball) players
Expatriate basketball people from Georgia (country) in Germany
Expatriate basketball people from Georgia (country) in Italy
Expatriate basketball people from Georgia (country) in Slovenia
Expatriate basketball people from Georgia (country) in Russia
Expatriate basketball people from Georgia (country) in Turkey
Expatriate basketball people from Georgia (country) in Ukraine
KK Olimpija players
Lega Basket Serie A players
Men's basketball players from Georgia (country)
Mitteldeutscher BC players
Pallacanestro Cantù players
Pallacanestro Reggiana players
Pallacanestro Treviso players
PBC CSKA Moscow players
Shooting guards
Small forwards
Basketball players from Tbilisi
Basketball coaches from Georgia (country)